Stirnemann is a German surname. Notable people with the surname include:

Matthias Stirnemann (born 1991), Swiss cyclist
M. Vänçi Stirnemann (born 1951), Swiss artist, writer and curator

See also
Gunda Niemann-Stirnemann (born 1966), German speed skater

German-language surnames